The 5"/54 caliber Mark 16 gun (spoken "five-inch-fifty-four-caliber") was a late World War II–era naval gun mount used by the United States Navy, and later, the Japan Maritime Self-Defense Force.  These guns, designed originally for the s and then the abortive CL-154-class cruisers, were to be the replacement for the 5"/38 caliber secondary gun batteries then in widespread use with the US Navy.

Design
The 5"/54 cal gun turrets were similar to the 5"/38 caliber gun mounts in that they were equally adept in an anti-aircraft role and for damaging smaller ships, but differed in that they weighed more, fired heavier rounds of ammunition, and resulted in faster crew fatigue than the 5"/38 cal. guns.

The cancellations of the Montana-class battleships in 1943 and then the CL-154 class cruisers in 1945 pushed back the first use of the 5"/54 cal guns to their installation aboard the US Navy's s. The guns proved adequate for the carrier's air defense, but were gradually phased out of use by the carrier fleet because of their weight (rather than having the carrier defend itself by gunnery the task would be assigned to other surrounding ships within a carrier battle group). These mounts were then installed in the Japanese  and  destroyers in 1958–59.

Usage

See also
 5"/54 caliber Mark 42 gun
 5"/54 caliber Mark 45 gun

References

Notes

Sources

External links
 United States of America 5"/54 (12.7 cm) Mark 16

 

127 mm artillery
5 inch
Naval guns of the United States
Naval weapons of the Cold War
Japan Maritime Self-Defense Force
Weapons and ammunition introduced in 1945